Three Chord Wonders were an Australian country music trio of Andrew Clermont, Lawrie Minson and John Green, which formed in 1985. Their album, Try Change (1986), was nominated for a 1987 ARIA Award for Best Country Album. The group disbanded in 1988

Discography

Albums

Awards and nominations

ARIA Music Awards
The ARIA Music Awards are a set of annual ceremonies presented by Australian Recording Industry Association (ARIA), which recognise excellence, innovation, and achievement across all genres of the music of Australia. They commenced in 1987. 

! 
|-
| rowspan="2"| 1987 || Try Change || ARIA Award for Best Country Album ||  ||

Country Music Awards of Australia
The Country Music Awards of Australia (CMAA) (also known as the Golden Guitar Awards) is an annual awards night held in January during the Tamworth Country Music Festival, celebrating recording excellence in the Australian country music industry. They have been held annually since 1973.

|-
| 1987
| "Losin' My Blues Tonight"
| Vocal Group or Duo of the Year
|

References

Australian country music groups